The Very Best of the Steve Miller Band is a 1991 German compilation by the Steve Miller Band.

Track listing 
"Space Intro" (Steve Miller) – 1:16
"Fly Like an Eagle" (Miller) – 4:45
"The Joker" (Miller) – 4:25
"Abracadabra" (Miller) – 3:39
"Give It Up" (Miller) – 3:34
"Rock'n Me" (Miller) – 3:05
"Macho City" (Miller) – 3:21
"Serenade from the Stars" (Miller, Chris McCarthy) – 3:11
"Threshold" (Miller, Byron Allred) – 1:06
"Jet Airliner" (Paul Pena) – 3:34
"Keeps Me Wondering Why" (Gary Mallaber, Kenny Lewis) – 3:39
"Jungle Love" (Lonnie Turner, Greg Douglass) – 3:08
"Take the Money and Run" (Miller) – 2:49
"True Fine Love" (Miller) – 2:39
"Wild Mountain Honey" (Steve McCarthy) – 4:51
"Winter Time" (Miller) – 3:11
"The Stake" (David Denny) – 3:56
"Swingtown" (Miller, Chris McCarthy) – 3:28
"The Window" (Miller, Jason Cooper) – 4:17

Personnel
Steve Miller – vocals, guitars, keyboards, electronics
Byron Allred – synthesizers
Greg Douglass – guitar
Gerald Johnson – bass
Kenny Lewis – guitars and bass
Gary Mallaber – drums
Lonnie Turner – bass
Jacheem Young – B-3 organ

Certifications

Misc.
All Songs Produced By Steve Miller For Sailor Records

References

1991 greatest hits albums
Steve Miller Band compilation albums